James Odell Barnes Jr. (aka Odell Barnes) has earned the nickname "Foreclosure King." His firm, Odell Barnes REO, is a bulk-buyer of foreclosed homes in the United States. For decades, Barnes has been buying foreclosed homes in bulk from banks and other mortgage-lenders and selling them to a network of private investors and directly to homeowners. Barnes and his investors sell the homes below current market value, typically with low down payments and higher-than-normal interest rates.

Foreclosure crisis 

Odell Barnes gained notoriety after being featured on "Nightline". In 2008, with the Financial Crisis in full swing, Odell was one of the few people still doing well in the real estate market.

"Two years ago, you bought 100, 200 houses a month, now you buy 2,000 to 3,000 houses a month and it's going to be more," Barnes said. "They don't know what to do with them, the mortgage companies, and they're just dumping them."

Business practices 

Barnes buys homes from banks at deep discounts ("pennies on the dollar"). He and his investors mark their homes for sale at prices below comparable rentals and apply higher-than-market interest rates.
"People want to own a home," said Barnes. "And these people -- they're poor, they ain't dumb. They know how to put in a hot-water heater. If their house needs to be painted, they'll go to Lowe's to buy a gallon of paint and they'll paint it. They don't have book sense, but they know how to fix up their house. And it's amazing -- you go to them and they fix them up and they're so proud and they own a home."

The benefit of Barnes business to lower-income groups is debatable. Barnes emphasizes that he provides for people with no other way of achieving home-ownership. According to an investor:

You're more involved in the neighborhood if you own the house versus a renter... A renter is typically in the mindset of just passing through. I had an opportunity where we sold a house that we were renting; a homeowner bought the house and put a new roof on it. Suddenly they care.

Personal life 
He was last married to Wanda Barnes and had two step daughters; Bailey Oliger and Drew Oliger.
He used to date an unsuccessful property management company owner of a business that no longer exists Paige Davis of Paige Property Management (now closed by court order). He now dates a traveling RN and travels with her around the country.

External links 
 "Foreclosure King: Best Thing for Distressed Neighborhoods Is Homeowners" -ABC news
 VIDEO -ABC Nightline
 "Buying Foreclosed Homes With a Mouse Click" -WSJ
  "Beyond Subprime: Reselling Foreclosed Homes" -NPR

References 

1952 births
Living people
Businesspeople from South Carolina
American real estate businesspeople
People from Palatka, Florida